Batik is a pure-Java library that can be used to render, generate, and manipulate SVG graphics (SVG is an XML markup language for describing two-dimensional vector graphics). IBM supported the project and then donated the code to the Apache Software Foundation, where other companies and teams decided to join efforts.
Batik provides a set of core modules that provide functionality to:

 Render and dynamically modify SVG content,
 Transcode SVG content to some raster Graphics file formats, such as PNG, JPEG and TIFF,
 Transcode Windows Metafiles to SVG (WMF or Windows Metafile Format is the vector format used by Microsoft Windows applications),
 And manage scripting and user events on SVG documents.

The Batik distribution also contains a ready-to-use SVG browser (called Squiggle) making use of the above modules.

The name of the library comes from the Batik painting technique.

Status

Version 1.7, made available on January 10, 2008, had an "almost full" implementation of the current state of the sXBL specification, a nearly complete implementation of SVG declarative animation SMIL features, and some of the SVG 1.2 late October 2004 working draft (see SVG's Development history).

See also

Scalable Vector Graphics
Synchronized Multimedia Integration Language
sXBL: a mechanism for defining the presentation and interactive behaviour of elements described in a namespace other than SVG files

References

External links
Apache Batik Project
Current status of Batik's sXBL implementation
The official SVG page at W3C, SVG Working Group

Batik
Graphics libraries
Java platform
Free software programmed in Java (programming language)
Scalable Vector Graphics
Java (programming language) libraries